An isotopomer or isotopic isomer is an isomer that is an isotope, having the same mass number of each isotope of each element in a different arrangement. The result is that the molecules are either constitutional isomers or stereoisomers solely based on isotopic location. They have applications in areas including nuclear magnetic resonance spectroscopy, reaction kinetics, and biochemistry.

Description 
Isotopomers or isotopic isomers are isomers with isotopic atoms, having the same number of each isotope of each element but differing in their subatomic positions. The result is that the molecules are either constitutional isomers or stereoisomers solely based on isotopic location. The term isotopomer was first proposed by Seeman and Paine in 1992 to distinguish isotopic isomers from isotopologues (isotopic homologues).

Examples 
 CH3CHDCH3 and CH3CH2CH2D are a pair of constitutional isotopomers of propane.
 (R)- and (S)-CH3CHDOH  are isotopic stereoisomers of ethanol.
 (Z)- and (E)-CH3CH=CHD are examples of isotopic stereoisomers of propene.

Use

13C-NMR 
In nuclear magnetic resonance spectroscopy, the highly abundant 12C isotope does not produce any signal whereas the comparably rare 13C isotope is easily detected. As a result, carbon isotopomers of a compound can be studied by carbon-13 NMR to learn about the different carbon atoms in the structure. Each individual structure that contains a single 13C isotope provides data about the structure in its immediate vicinity. A large sample of a chemical contains a mixture of all such isotopomers, so a single spectrum of the sample contains data about all carbons in it. Nearly all of the carbon in normal samples of carbon-based chemicals is 12C, with only about 1% abundance of 13C, so there is only about a 1% abundance of the total of the singly-substituted isotopologues, and exponentially smaller amounts of structures having two or more 13C in them. The rare case where two adjacent carbon atoms in a single structure are both 13C causes a detectable coupling effect between them as well as signals for each one itself. The INADEQUATE correlation experiment uses this effect to provide evidence for which carbon atoms in a structure are attached to each other, which can be useful for determining the actual structure of an unknown chemical.

Reaction kinetics 
In reaction kinetics, a rate effect is sometimes observed between different isotopomers of the same chemical. This kinetic isotope effect can be used to study reaction mechanisms by analyzing how the differently massed atom is involved in the process.

Biochemistry 
In biochemistry, differences between the isotopomers of biochemicals such as starches is of practical importance in archaeology. They offer clues to the diet of prehistoric humans that lived as long ago as paleolithic times. This is because naturally occurring carbon dioxide contains both 12C and 13C. Monocots, such as rice and oats, differ from dicots, such as potatoes and tree fruits, in the relative amounts of 12CO2 and 13CO2 that they incorporate into their tissues as products of photosynthesis. When tissues of such subjects are recovered, usually tooth or bone, the relative isotopic content can give useful indications of the main source of the staple foods of the subjects of the investigations.

See also
 Mass (mass spectrometry)
 Isotopocule
 Cumomer

References

Physical chemistry
Isomerism